"Don't Wanna Change the World" is a song written by David Darlington. Karen Manno and Jonathan Rosen  and recorded by American R&B singer Phyllis Hyman, taken from her eighth studio album, Prime of My Life. The hit song spent one week at number-one on the US R&B chart in September 1991, becoming Hyman's only career number-one hit.

Track listing
Cassette single
 "Don't Wanna Change the World" (Rap version) – 5:22
 "Don't Wanna Change the World" (No Rap version) – 4:09

CD Promo single
 "Don't Wanna Change the World" (No Rap version) – 4:09
 "Don't Wanna Change the World" (Rap version) – 5:22
 "Don't Wanna Change the World" (Extended Rap version) – 6:58

12" Promo single
 "Don't Wanna Change the World" (Extended Rap version) – 6:58
 "Don't Wanna Change the World" (No Rap version) – 4:09
 "Don't Wanna Change the World" (Rap version) – 5:22

Weekly Charts

References

See also 
List of number-one R&B singles of 1991 (U.S.)

1991 singles
Philadelphia International Records singles
1991 songs
New jack swing songs
Phyllis Hyman songs